Chlorencoelia is a genus of fungi in the family Hemiphacidiaceae. The genus, which contains three species, was circumscribed by J.R. Dixon in 1975.

References

Helotiales genera